Miguel Carol  is an S3 swimmer from Spain.  He competed at the 1968 Summer Paralympics, winning a silver in the 50m breaststroke and a bronze in the 100m breaststroke.

References 

Living people
Paralympic silver medalists for Spain
Swimmers at the 1968 Summer Paralympics
Year of birth missing (living people)
Paralympic medalists in swimming
Medalists at the 1968 Summer Paralympics
Paralympic swimmers of Spain
Spanish male breaststroke swimmers